Swansea Hockey Club is a field hockey club based at Swansea University. The club was founded in 2018 following a merger between Swansea University Men's Hockey Club, Swansea University Ladies Hockey Club, Swansea City and Spartans. The Swansea University team had been founded in 1920 as one of the University's founding sports.

The club runs nine women's teams (including 3 University teams)  with the first XI playing in the Women's England Hockey League Division One North  and nine men's teams (including 3 University teams)  with the first XI playing in a lower league called the Men's Verde Recreo League.

References

Welsh field hockey clubs
2018 establishments in England
Sport in Swansea
Sport in Glamorgan
Sport in Wales